Buchnerodendron is a genus of flowering plants belonging to the family Achariaceae.

Its native range is Tropical Africa.

Species:

Buchnerodendron lasiocalyx 
Buchnerodendron speciosum

References

Achariaceae
Malpighiales genera